Derek Ryan Smith (born March 10, 1987), known professionally as Mod Sun (stylized as MOD SUN or MODSUN), is an American singer, songwriter, multi-instrumentalist and rapper from Bloomington, Minnesota. He has released four solo studio albums, three EPs, and six mixtapes.

Beginning his musical career by playing drums in pop punk band the Semester and post-hardcore groups Four Letter Lie and Scary Kids Scaring Kids, Smith began a solo rap career in 2009 under the name Mod Sun. The release of his fourth solo studio album Internet Killed The Rockstar saw a stylistic shift back to pop punk. He is also a member of the alternative hip hop duo Hotel Motel. His fifth studio album God Save The Teen was released on February 3, 2023.

Early life 
Derek Ryan Smith was born on March 10, 1987, in Bloomington, Minnesota. Later his father left for California and his parents divorced, after which Smith spent some time living with his father in Long Beach, California. From age five to 10, he moved frequently due to his mother having to relocate for various jobs. He spent much of his time growing up on a farm in Corcoran, Minnesota. Smith's father lived next door to Bud Gaugh, drummer of Sublime, who influenced him to become involved in music.

In his teens, Smith began attending concerts in his local pop punk scene. He became an increasingly prominent figure in the scene through his mother encouraging him to attend concerts and ask the touring band members whether they wanted to stay the night at their house. In the following years, Smith and other local bands and musicians in the scene became increasingly interested in fashion and influenced by New Jersey and Drive-Thru Records emo bands, leading to them becoming members of the scene subculture. In eighth grade, he designed merchandise for bands.

Music career

2004–2010: Career beginnings 
Smith's first band was the pop punk band Sideline Heroes. He then began playing drums for local pop punk band the Semester in his sophomore year of high school. He spent the following four years in the band, before being kicked out three months after his graduation. In 2005, he became a member of the post-hardcore band Four Letter Lie. In 2009, he left the band to pursue his passion in rap and Mod Sun endeavours. He went on to be a drum tech for Scary Kids Scaring Kids. He was eventually asked to be the drummer for Scary Kids Scaring Kids, which he accepted under the condition that he could open for the band on tour as a solo artist.

2011–2019: Solo career and Look Up, Movie and BB 
Mod Sun has released five mixtapes and three EPs throughout his solo career. His style of music has been described as "hippy hop".

Mod Sun's debut album, Look Up, was released on March 10, 2015, through Rostrum Records. It peaked at #1 on the Billboard Top Heatseekers chart.

On March 10, 2017, his second studio album, Movie, was released, also through Rostrum Records. It peaked at #16 on the Billboard Top Heatseekers chart.

His third studio album BB was released on November 10, 2017, and spawned the single "#noshirton".

2020–present: Switch to pop punk, Internet Killed the Rockstar and God Save the Teen 

In early 2020, Mod Sun announced he had started working on his forthcoming fourth studio album. Its lead single "Karma" was released on October 30, 2020. The accompanying music video was released three weeks later on November 16, 2020, and was directed by Machine Gun Kelly. The song "Bones" was released as the album's second single on November 27, 2020. The music video for "Bones" was released on December 21, 2020, via Mod Sun's official YouTube channel and was directed by Charlie Zwick. The album's third single, "Flames", was a collaboration with Avril Lavigne. On January 18, 2021, Downfalls High, a film Smith co-directed with Machine Gun Kelly was released. On 25 January, 2021 Mod Sun officially announced the album title, Internet Killed the Rockstar, and its release date, February 12, 2021.

On March 12, 2021, he released the single "Heavy" featuring blackbear. The same month he signed a long-term deal with Big Noise.

On August 26, 2021, it was announced that he would star in and co–direct the film Good Mourning With A U, alongside Machine Gun Kelly, Dove Cameron, Megan Fox and Becky G. The film was later retitled to simply Good Mourning, and was released on April 20, 2022.

On May 7, 2021, a deluxe version of Internet Killed the Rockstar was released. It features five new tracks as well as acoustic versions of "Karma" and "Flames" and a piano version of "Bones".

On February 18, 2022, Mod Sun released a documentary about his life entitled Remember Me Just Like This on his YouTube channel. The documentary included a teaser for his next single "Rich Kids Ruin Everything", which was released on March 11, 2022.

On February 25, 2022, Avril Lavigne's seventh studio album Love Sux was released. Mod Sun produced, provided drums for, and cowrote every song on the album (with the exception of "Dare to Love Me" and "Break of a Heartache", which Lavigne wrote alone).

On June 10, 2022, he released the single "Perfectly Imperfect".

On August 19, 2022, he released the single "Battle Scars".

In November 2022, Mod Sun announced the title for his upcoming fifth studio album: God Save The Teen. The album was revealed to be released in early 2023, though an exact release date was yet to be announced.

On December 9, 2022, he released the single "SEXOXO" featuring Charlotte Sands.

On January 17, 2023, he revealed the album artwork and tracklist for his fifth studio album God Save the Teen, and announced that it would be released on February 3. The tracklist contained twelve new songs, including a cover of the song "Iris" by The Goo Goo Dolls.

On February 3, 2023, God Save the Teen was released.

Personal life 
Beginning in October 2018, Smith was in a polyamorous relationship with internet personality Tana Mongeau and actress Bella Thorne. After the throuple's breakup, he began a monogamous relationship with Thorne. Smith and Thorne became engaged, got married and then subsequently divorced, all within 15 months. In early 2020, he began a monogamous relationship with Mongeau, but they broke up by the end of the year.

From 2021 to 2023, he was in a relationship with Canadian musician Avril Lavigne. They later got engaged in Paris in April 2022, but subsequently broke off the engagement on February 21, 2023. A spokesperson for Sun initially appeared surprised, saying “they were together and engaged as of 3 days ago when he left for tour so if anything has changed that's news to him.” Lavigne was photographed hugging rapper Tyga after the split, sparking rumors that the two were dating. On February 28, Sun confirmed the split, saying "In 1 week my entire life completely changed… I just know there's a plan for it all… I'll keep my head up + always listen to my heart, even when it feels broken. Being surrounded by love every night on tour has been an absolute blessing. I have the best friends in the entire world, thanks for always having my back. See you on stage."

Discography

Studio albums

Extended plays

Mixtapes
2009: I'll Buy Myself
2009: Let Ya Teeth Show
2009: How to Make a MOD SUN
2011: Health, Wealth, Success, & Happiness
2011: Blazed by the Bell
2012: First Take

Singles

Featured singles
2011: "Good Times" by swimming with dolphins
2012: "I Think It's Hot" by Def Gone Graphic
2012: "Catch Me Smilin" by Joe B.
2013: "Right Now" by Goody
2013: "Get Loco" by T.T.
2013: "The Tortoise and the Hare" by The Weekend Hustler
2013: "Let It Bang" by Jbre & Dougie Kent
2014: "All I Need Is Sunshine" by The Gooneez & Sidereal
2014: "Raw Cypher" by Dizzy Wright, Like, and Sir Michael Rocks
2015: "me you & the moon" by Call Me Karizma
2016: "Sublime" by Machine Gun Kelly
2018: ":)" by LIL PHAG and Dr. Woke
2021: "0X1=Lovesong (I Know I Love You)" by Tomorrow X Together
2021: "Ocean of Embers"
2021: "Broken in All the Right Places" by Lost Kings
2022: "Timebomb" by Two Friends
2022: "Movie Star" by Steve Aoki

Books

Non-fiction books
2012: Did I Ever Wake Up?

Poetry books
2015: My Dear Pink
2018: So Long Los Angeles

Journals
2015: "Happy to Be Here"
2016: "Happy to Be Here Pt. 2"
2019: "Happy to Be Here Pt. 3"

Filmography

Film

Television

Internet

Music videos

References

External links 

1987 births
Living people
People from Bloomington, Minnesota
American male rappers
Rappers from Minnesota
Midwest hip hop musicians
21st-century American rappers
Scary Kids Scaring Kids members
21st-century American male musicians
Pop punk musicians